Fiona Hale (February 7, 1926 - April 22, 2014) was an American actress. Her career began in 1949 in the movie Harriet Craig. She is known for her roles in Minority Report (2002), The Curious Case of Benjamin Button (2008), and Seven Pounds (2008).

Hale was born in New York City.

Partial filmography
 The Incredible Burt Wonderstone (2013)
 Seven Pounds (2008)
 The Curious Case of Benjamin Button (2008)
 Minority Report (2002)
 Corky Romano (2001)
 Shotgun (1955)
 Interrupted Melody (1955)
 Harriet Craig (1949)

References

External links
 

1926 births
2014 deaths
American film actresses
American television actresses
Actresses from New York (state)
21st-century American actresses